Stanisław Tyszka (born 11 April 1979, in Warsaw) is a Polish politician and university lecturer. He has served as a member of the Sejm since 2015, and as Deputy Marshal of the Sejm since November of the same year.

Biography

Tyszka is a graduate of the Faculty of Law and Administration at the University of Warsaw. Tyszka also read philosophy at the Jagiellonian University, and sociology at Charles University in Prague. He completed his doctoral studies at the European University Institute in Florence in 2011.

Tyszka is an assistant professor at the Faculty of Applied Social Sciences and Rehabilitation at the University of Warsaw. From 2011–2012, he was director of the Republican Foundation. In 2012 became an adviser to the then-Minister of Justice, Jarosław Gowin. Tyszka won a seat in the 2015 parliamentary elections on the Kukiz'15 list, appearing first on the party list. He has served as Deputy Marshal of the Sejm since November 2015.

On 15th November 2022 at a press conference Tyszka announced a change in his political affiliation to KORWiN (a part of Konfederacja) stating reasons such as his former party voting alongside the government and the fact that KORWiN had opposed restrictions on civil rights imposed due to the COVID-19 pandemic.

Personal life
Tyszka is married to Marguerite Pakier, and has a daughter.

References

1979 births
Living people
Politicians from Warsaw
University of Warsaw alumni
European University Institute alumni
Kukiz'15 politicians
Deputy Marshals of the Sejm of the Third Polish Republic
Members of the Polish Sejm 2015–2019
Members of the Polish Sejm 2019–2023